The 2011–12 Kansas Magic season was the first and only season of the Kansas Magic indoor soccer club as a franchise in the Professional Arena Soccer League. The Magic were an Eastern Division team who played this season's home games at EPIC Indoor Sports Center in Overland Park, Kansas. The team was led by head coach Randall Porter.

Off-field moves
In February 2011, the Kansas Magic franchise was announced to begin play with an April 30 exhibition game against the Illinois Piasa at the Kansas Expocentre's Landon Arena in Topeka, Kansas. The team was announced without a signed arena lease as both the franchise and venue wanted to judge response to the exhibition game. When the team began regular play in November 2011, it was instead based out of the Kansas City suburb of Overland Park, Kansas.

The team's dance team, under the direction of Karen Burec, was known as the Magic Jeanies.

Roster moves
The team held its first round of open tryouts on March 19, 2011, at the Topeka Sports Factory in Topeka, Kansas. In April 2011, Graceland University seniors Orin Branker and Kasy Kiarash were signed by the Magic. They joined fellow Graceland Yellowjackets alumni Matt Klaus, Stefan De Las, Brett Porter on the then-current roster.

The team held open tryouts on October 23, 2011, at their regular season home facility, the arena at the EPIC Indoor Sports Center in Overland Park, Kansas.

Schedule

Exhibition

Regular season

Post-season

References

External links
EPIC Indoor Sports Complex official website

Kansas Magic
Soccer in Kansas
Kansas Magic
Kansas Magic